Norman Barry Dodds (born April 1943) is a Church of Ireland priest.

Dodds was educated at the Open University and the Church of Ireland Theological College; and ordained in 1977. After a curacy at Ballynafeigh he was the incumbent at St Michael, Belfast from 1980 until 2014; and from 2009 until 2013 the inaugural Archdeacon of Belfast.

References

1943 births
Archdeacons of Belfast
Alumni of the Open University
Alumni of the Church of Ireland Theological Institute
Living people